The 2011 Fenland District Council election took place on 5 May 2011 to elect members of Fenland District Council in Cambridgeshire, England. The whole council was up for election and the Conservative Party stayed in overall control of the council.

Background
In the 2007 election, the Conservatives won 39 of the 40 seats, with the only other seat being won by an independent. However, in April 2010 Liberal Democrat Dave Patrick gained a seat at a by-election from the Conservatives in Kirkgate ward.

A total of 96 candidates stood in the election for the 40 seats on the council. 2 Conservatives candidates were unopposed at the election, Martin Curtis in Kingsmoor and Pop Jolley in Wimblington, a substantial drop from the number at the 2007 election. For the other 38 seats the candidates were 38 Conservatives, 20 Labour, 19 Liberal Democrats, 10 independents, 4 United Kingdom Independence Party and 3 Green Party. The most candidates were in Waterlees ward in Wisbech, where 9 candidates stood for 2 seats on the council.

Election result
The Conservatives retained control of the council, but their majority was reduced slightly. They won 34 of the 40 seats on the council, after losing 4 seats, 3 to independents and 1 to the Liberal Democrats. The wins for the Conservatives included Will Sutton in Elm and Christchurch, where he defeated the former Conservative member of the cabinet Phil Webb, who been deselected before the election and stood as an independent. Conservative leader of the council Alan Melton, who comfortably held his own seat in Birch ward in Chatteris, said he was "ecstatic" at the results, which he said showed support for his party's policies.

The Conservatives losses came in Waterlees, where independents Michael and Virginia Bucknor gained both seats from the Conservatives, and in March West where independent Rob Skoulding took one of the three seats. Meanwhile, Liberal Democrat Gavin Booth gained one of the two seats in Parson Drove and Wisbech St Mary from the Conservatives. After independent Mark Archer and Liberal Democrat Dave Patrick held their seats, this meant the opposition on the council was 4 independent and 2 Liberal Democrat councillors.

Ward results

Bassenhally (Whittlesey)

Benwick, Coates and Eastrea

Birch (Chatteris

Clarkson (Wisbech)

Delph

Doddington

Elm and Christchurch

Hill (Wisbech)

Kingsmoor (Whittlesey))

Kirkgate (Wisbech)

Lattersey (Whittlesey)

Manea

March East

March North

March West

Medworth (Wisbech)

Parson Drove & Wisbech St Mary

Peckover (Wisbech)

Roman Bank

Slade Lode

Staithe (Wisbech)

The Mills

References

2011 English local elections
2011
2010s in Cambridgeshire